Vasily Potapov (born 4 March 1955) is a Russian rower. He competed in the men's eight event at the 1976 Summer Olympics.

References

1955 births
Living people
Russian male rowers
Olympic rowers of the Soviet Union
Rowers at the 1976 Summer Olympics